Karapınar is a neighborhood of Karamürsel district of Kocaeli Province, Turkey.

Geography 
It is 37 km from Kocaeli city center and 5 km from Karamürsel.

Population

References 

Villages in Kocaeli Province